Choline kinase beta (CK), also known as Ethanolamine kinase (EK), Choline kinase-like protein , choline/ethanolamine kinase beta (CKEKB), or Choline/ethanolamine kinase is a protein encoded by the CHKB gene. This gene is found on chromosome 22 in humans. The encoded protein plays a key role in phospholipid biosynthesis. Choline kinase (CK) and ethanolamine kinase (EK) catalyzes the first step in phosphatidylethanolamine biosynthesis. Read-through transcripts are expressed from this locus that include exons from the downstream CPT1B locus.

Structure
The CHKB gene is located on the q arm of chromosome 22 at position 13.3 and it spans 4,041 base pairs. The CHKB gene produces a 7 kDa protein composed of 60 amino acids. The structure of the protein has been found to be a homodimer, and forms a heterodimer with the CHKA protein. It has also been found to contain multiple highly conserved domains, such as a Brenner phosphotransferase consensus sequence essential in catalytic function.

Function

The CHKB gene encodes for a key protein in phospholipid biosynthesis.
The choline kinase (CK) and ethanolamine kinase (EK) proteins, which are coded by the CHKB gene, catalyze the phosphorylation of choline/ethanolamine in vitro to phosphocholine/phosphoethanolamine. The catalysis is controlled by ATP in the presence of magnesium and ADP, and commits choline to the enzymatic pathway for biosynthesis of phosphatidylcholine. This is the first step in the biosynthesis of phosphocholine/phosphoethanolamine in all animal cells, and is done by the Kennedy pathway. The highly purified choline kinases from mammalian sources and their recombinant gene products have been shown to have ethanolamine kinase activity as well, indicating that both activities reside on the same protein. However, it has been shown that the protein has higher activity with ethanolamine and may not significantly contribute to in vivo phosphatidylcholine biosynthesis. The choline kinase-like protein encoded by CHKB belongs to the choline/ethanolamine kinase family; however, its exact function is not known. At least two transcript variants encoding two different isoforms have been found for this gene, and one of the transcripts is bicistronic.

Clinical significance
Mutations in CHKB have been found to result in mitochondrial deficiencies and associated disorders. Knockdown of the gene has been known to result in decreased choline kinase and phosphatidylcholine activity. This impairment in activity may lead to a modified composition of the phospholipid composition in the mitochondrial membrane resulting in major disorders in the function and structure of the mitochondria. Major disorders include as Megaconial Congenital Muscular Dystrophy (MDCMC), and Narcolepsy.

Megaconial Congenital Muscular Dystrophy (MDCMC)
CHKB mutations have been majorly associated with Megaconial Congenital Muscular Dystrophy (MDCMC). Megaconial Congenital Muscular Dystrophy (MDCMC) is an autosomal recessive congenital muscular dystrophy characterized by muscle biopsy results displaying an enlarged mitochondria which are common in the periphery of the fibers but scarce around the center.

Common clinical manifestations of MDCMC include:
early-onset hypotonia
muscle wasting
mildly elevated serum creatine kinase (CK) levels
severe intellectual disability without brain structural abnormalities
Gower's sign
mental retardation
fatal cardiomyopathy

Symptoms such as neurogenic atrophy, enlarged mitochondria in the periphery of the fibers, and complex I deficiency were shown in a Spanish patient with a homozygous mutation of c.810T>A. Another patient with a homozygous mutation (p.E292X) in the CHKB gene exhibited rhythmic jerkings of arms, which were characterized as muscle spasms. Finally, a patient with a homozygous c.810T>A showed signs of Gower's sign, hypotonia, and proximal muscle weakness.

Narcolepsy
Narcolepsy is a neurological disabling sleep disorder, characterized by excessive daytime sleepiness, sleep fragmentation, symptoms of abnormal rapid-eye-movement (REM) sleep, cataplexy, hypnagogic hallucinations, and sleep paralysis. Cataplexy is a sudden loss of muscle tone triggered by emotions, which is the most valuable clinical feature used to diagnose narcolepsy. Human narcolepsy is primarily a sporadically occurring disorder but familial clustering has been observed.

Interactions
CHKB has been shown to have Protein-protein interactions with the following.

 ALB
 Human serum albumin

References

External links

Further reading